The 2021 Sarawak state election, formally the 12th Sarawak general election, took place on 18 December 2021. This election was to elect 82 members of the 19th Sarawak State Legislative Assembly. The previous assembly was dissolved on 3 November 2021.

As the previous assembly first sat on 7 June 2016, it was originally set to be dissolved automatically on 7 June 2021. However, the 2021 state emergency declaration, preceded by a federal 2021 Malaysian state of emergency declaration nationwide, arising from the 2020–2022 Malaysian political crisis and the COVID-19 pandemic, suspended the automatic dissolution of the legislature until the proposed end of the emergency duration on 2 February 2022. On 3 November 2021, Yang di-Pertuan Agong Al-Sultan Abdullah Ri'ayatuddin Al-Mustafa Billah Shah had consented to lift the state of emergency thus the state legislative assembly dissolved automatically and the state election must be held within 60 days after to elect a new state government.

For the first time as a local coalition, Gabungan Parti Sarawak (GPS) won an overwhelming landslide in the election, winning 76 seats and a supermajority over the legislature. At the same time, Parti Sarawak Bersatu (PSB) won four seats, becoming the largest opposition and the first Sarawak-based opposition party to win a seat in an election since 2006. Meanwhile, Pakatan Harapan (PH), however, suffered a crushing defeat, with the Democratic Action Party (DAP) winning only two seats for the coalition, experiencing a decline from seven seats in 2016. Its other component parties, People's Justice Party (PKR) and National Trust Party (AMANAH) lost in all seats contested by the both parties.

Background

Previous election 

The size of the Legislative Assembly was enlarged from 71 to 82 members in the last state election. The incumbent Sarawak Barisan Nasional coalition, led by Adenan Satem, won 72 seats, allowing it to form a majority government. This included 11 members who were not affiliated with any of its component parties.

The election was the first major election for the then newly-formed Pakatan Harapan coalition, the successor to the Pakatan Rakyat coalition. But like its predecessor, it was only an electoral alliance at that time. However, the component parties of the coalition, winning the remaining 10 seats, suffered a swing of 9.63 percentage points against it and an overall loss of 5 seats compared to the 2011 election.

Between June and August 2016, the 11 partyless Barisan Nasional members either joined the United Bumiputera Heritage Party, or left the coalition and joined the then United People's Party (now Parti Sarawak Bersatu). The United People's Party however committed their support for the Barisan Nasional government.

Death of Adenan Satem 
On 11 January 2017, Chief Minister Adenan Satem died from cardiac arrest, thus he was unable to complete his second term. This made him the first sitting Chief Minister of Sarawak to have died while in office. Abang Johari Openg took over the position two days later. A by-election was held in Adenan's seat of Tanjong Datu on 18 February, which was overwhelmingly retained by the Barisan Nasional coalition.

2018 federal election 
The 2018 federal election resulted in an unprecedented victory for the opposition Pakatan Harapan coalition. In response, the four component parties of Barisan Nasional in Sarawak left the coalition and together formed the Gabungan Parti Sarawak coalition on 12 June 2018.

Malaysian political crisis 

A political crisis began at the federal level in February 2020, resulting in the collapse of the Pakatan Harapan federal government and the establishment of a Perikatan Nasional government. While Sarawak remained largely unaffected, the People's Justice Party lost all of its representation in the Legislative Assembly by April 2020, with all six remaining Pakatan Harapan seats being held by the Democratic Action Party. The Malaysian United Indigenous Party saw its introduction in the state with the membership of Ali Biju, the MLA for Krian.

2020–21 events 
On 26 July 2020, the member for Padungan, Wong King Wei, left the Democratic Action Party to sit as an independent member. This resulted in Parti Sarawak Bersatu overtaking Pakatan Harapan as the second largest grouping in the Legislative Assembly. PSB chairman Wong Soon Koh took over as opposition leader on 9 November 2020 

On 1 August 2020, the newly-formed political informal alliance Gabungan Anak Sarawak (GASAK) which includes parties of Sarawak People's Aspiration Party (Aspirasi), Sarawak Workers Party (SWP), Parti Bansa Dayak Sarawak Baru (PBDSB), with NGOs of Sarawak for Sarawakians (S4S) and Sarawak Independence Alliance (SIA) announced that GASAK will contest in all 82 seats in next state election, using Aspirasi's logo. The statement was later revised on 1 October 2020, with GASAK parties contesting 50 seats and the rest contested by an unaffiliated party, Sarawak People Awareness Party (SEDAR). SEDAR was planning to contest all 82 seats.

Media reports indicated in July 2020 that the election will likely be held in November after the consideration of the federal and state budgets in October. It is expected that at least three candidates (GPS, PH and a minor party) will be fielded in all 82 constituencies.

After the election schedule was announced, some nationalist parties such as Pejuang, Barisan Nasional and Bersatu stayed out of the election. Parti Tenaga Rakyat Sarawak (TERAS), a local party whose candidates in the last election contested as BN Direct Members, did not contest citing lack of preparation. PAS declared their intention to contest in the election as a warm-up to the next General Election.

Electoral system 
Elections in Malaysia are conducted at the federal and state levels. Federal elections elect members of the Dewan Rakyat, the lower house of Parliament, while state elections in each of the 13 states elect members of their respective state legislative assembly. As Malaysia follows the Westminster system of government, the head of government (Prime Minister at the federal level and the Menteri Besar/Chief Ministers at the state level) is the person who commands the confidence of the majority of members in the respective legislature – this is normally the leader of the party or coalition with the majority of seats in the legislature.

The Legislative Assembly consists of 82 members, known as Members of the Legislative Assembly (MLAs), that are elected for five-year terms. Each MLA is elected from a single-member constituencies using the first-past-the-post voting system; each constituency contains approximately an equal number of voters. If one party obtains a majority of seats, then that party is entitled to form the government, with its leader becoming the Chief Minister. In the event of a hung parliament, where no single party obtains the majority of seats, the government may still form through a coalition or a confidence and supply agreement with other parties. In practice, coalitions and alliances in Malaysia, and by extension, in Sarawak, generally persist between elections, and member parties do not normally contest for the same seats.

In general, the voting age is currently 21 although the age of majority in the country is 18. While the Constitution (Amendment) Act 2019, which provided for the voting age to be lowered to 18 and automatic voter registration, was enacted in July 2019, it was not proclaimed until 1 December 2021, which set 15 December as the commencement date of the amendment, after the voter lists for this election has been finalised. Cabinet Minister Abdul Karim Rahman Hamzah asserted that prospective voters between ages 18 and 20 who had registered before 2 November are allowed to vote in the election, but this has not been separately verified by the Election Commission. Elections are conducted by the Election Commission of Malaysia, which is under the jurisdiction of the Prime Minister's Department. Malaysia does not practice compulsory voting.

Timeline

Constituencies

Political parties

Campaign 
Campaigning in parking lots, open spaces, and large halls with the presence and cheers of hundreds of people has been the norm in previous elections, but the threat of COVID-19 has hindered it this time in the state election. Because of this, the Election Commission (EC) decided not to allow any physical campaigning, with only 64 of the 82 constituencies with inadequate internet access being allowed to hold talks. The EC has encouraged all candidates to use social media to campaign.

 
Despite the gloomy campaign mood caused by these restrictions, the candidates' campaign machinery has actively hung and put up flags, posters, and banners featuring candidate portraits and party logos, particularly from the opposing political parties.

Incumbents not seeking re-election 
The following members of the 18th Legislative Assembly are not contesting the upcoming election.

Electoral candidates

Results

Seats that changed allegiance

Election pendulum

Notes

References 

2021
Elections in Sarawak
2021 elections in Malaysia
Elections postponed due to the COVID-19 pandemic